Rosa Valiente (born June 26, 1996 in Lima, Peru) is a Peruvian volleyball player who plays for the Peru national team. Rosa was part of the team that won gold at the 2012 Youth South American Championship, the first gold medal for Peruvian volleyball in that category after 32 years and the first gold in any category in 19 years.

Clubs
  Tupac Amaru (2010–present)

Awards

Individuals
 2011 Liga Nacional Juvenil de Voleibol "Best Blocker"
 2011 U16 South American Championship "Best Server"
 2012 Youth South American Championship "Best Blocker"

National team

Junior team
 2011 U16 South American Championship -  Silver Medal
 2012 Junior South American Championship -  Silver Medal
 2012 Youth South American Championship -  Gold Medal

References

External links
 FPV Profile

1996 births
Living people
Peruvian women's volleyball players
Sportspeople from Lima
21st-century Peruvian women